Abby Z. is a contemporary plus size design label founded by Abby Zeichner in 2004.  The company specializes in runway designs for women sizes 12 through 24.

Opening and closing 
The Abby Z flagship store opened in  SoHo, New York at 57 Greene Street on August 13, 2008. The store closed less than two years later in 2009 when its parent company filed for bankruptcy.

References

External links 
 Abby Z

Clothing brands of the United States
Companies that filed for Chapter 11 bankruptcy in 2009